Van de Bunt is a surname. Notable people with the surname include:

 Arie van de Bunt (born 1969), Dutch water polo player 
 Jerry van de Bunt (born 1992), Dutch motorcycle racer
 Marjorie van de Bunt (born 1968), Dutch Paralympian

Surnames of Dutch origin